John Ernest Cull (8 November 1900 – 1964) was a footballer who played in the Football League for Accrington Stanley, Aldershot, Crewe Alexandra, Coventry City, Gateshead and Stoke City.

Career
Cull was born in Aston and played non-league football with Shrewsbury Town before impressing enough to earn a move to Stoke City in 1925. He was never able to fully establish himself in the "Potters" starting eleven being mainly used as back up. He spent five years at the Victoria Ground making 80 appearances scoring nine goals. After leaving Stoke, Cull went on to play for six different clubs spending a season at each. He played for Coventry City, Shrewsbury Town, Crewe Alexandra, Accrington Stanley, Gateshead before ending his career with Aldershot.

Career statistics
Source:

Honours
with Stoke City
Football League Third Division North Champions: 1926–27

References

English footballers
Aldershot F.C. players
Accrington Stanley F.C. (1891) players
Crewe Alexandra F.C. players
Coventry City F.C. players
Gateshead F.C. players
Stoke City F.C. players
Shrewsbury Town F.C. players
English Football League players
1900 births
1964 deaths
Association football forwards